Hans Nordin (7 January 1931 – 23 September 2021) was a Swedish ski jumper who competed in the 1950s. He finished 11th in the individual normal hill event at the 1952 Winter Olympics in Oslo. He was born in Härnösand, Ångermanland.

References

1924-56 Winter Olympic ski jumping results
Hans Nordin's profile at the Swedish Olympic Committee 

1931 births
2021 deaths
People from Härnösand
Olympic ski jumpers of Sweden
Ski jumpers at the 1952 Winter Olympics
Swedish male ski jumpers
Sportspeople from Västernorrland County